The men's fistball tournament at the 2022 World Games was held from 10 to 14 July at the Berylson Soccer Park in Birmingham, Alabama, United States.

Group stage
All times are local (GMT–5).

Group A

Group B

Knockout stage

Bracket

Semifinals

Seventh place game

Fifth place game

Bronze medal game

Gold medal game

Final standings

References

Men